Pascal Despeyroux (born 17 June 1965 in Toulouse) is a retired professional French footballer who played midfielder.

External links

Profile on French federation official site
Profile

1965 births
Living people
French footballers
France international footballers
Association football midfielders
Toulouse FC players
AS Saint-Étienne players
Canet Roussillon FC players
Ligue 1 players
Ligue 2 players